Heinz G. Konsalik, pseudonym of Heinz Günther (28 May 1921 – 2 October 1999) was a German novelist. Konsalik was his mother's maiden name.

During the Second World War he was a war correspondent, which provided many experiences for his novels.

Many of his books deal with war and showed the German human side of things as experienced by their soldiers and families at home, for instance Das geschenkte Gesicht (The bestowed face) which deals with a German soldier's recovery after his sledge ran over an anti-personnel mine and destroyed his face, and how this affected his relationship with his wife at home. It places no judgment on the German position in the war and simply deals with human beings in often desperate situations, doing what they were forced to do under German military law. Der Arzt von Stalingrad (The Doctor of Stalingrad) made him famous and was adapted as a movie in 1958. Some 83 million copies sold of his 155 novels made him the most popular German novelist of the postwar era and many of his novels were translated and sold through book clubs. He is buried in Cologne.

Life and work in the Nazi era
At the age of 16, Günther wrote feature articles for Cologne newspapers. In 1938 he published what he considered his “first usable poem.” On 31 August 1939 he completed the heroic tragedy Der Geuse (“The Beggar”) as a senior secondary student. He then joined the Hitler Youth, Area 11, Middle Rhine Valley. In December 1939 he started working for the Gestapo, the Nazi secret police. His next drama, which he completed in March 1940, was called Gutenberg. In the same year Günther sought membership in the Nazi writer's union, the Reich Chamber of Writers (Reichsschrifttumskammer) but was initially rejected due to the limited scope of his literary work. Later, however, having met the requirements, he received the chamber membership required for regular publication of literary works.

After graduating from the Humboldt-Gymnasium in Cologne, which required membership in the Nazi party and the teaching of its discredited but then pervasive racial theories, he studied medicine and later switched to theatre studies, literary history and German literature. During World War II he became a war correspondent in France and later came to the Eastern Front as a soldier, where he suffered a serious arm wound at Smolensk in the Soviet Union. He was later to describe his wartime experiences in Russia as a “monstrous school.”

Selected works 

Strike Force Ten
Agenten kennen kein Pardon
Alarm! Das Weiberschiff
Aus dem Nichts ein neues Leben
Bluthochzeit in Prag
Das Bernsteinzimmer
Das geschenkte Gesicht
Das Herz der 6. Armee
The Doctor of Stalingrad (1956)
Der Himmel über Kasachstan
Der Leibarzt der Zarin
Der letzte Karpatenwolf
Der Mann, der sein Leben vergaß
Der rostende Ruhm
Der Wüstendoktor
Des Sieges bittere Tränen
Die dunkle Seite des Ruhms
Die Rollbahn
Die schweigenden Kanäle
Die strahlenden Hände
Die Verdammten der Taiga
Dr. med. Erika Werner
Ein Komet fällt vom Himmel
Ein Kreuz in Sibirien
Ein Sommer mit Danica
Ein toter Taucher nimmt kein Gold
Eine Urwaldgöttin darf nicht weinen
Engel der Vergessenen
Frauenbataillon
Fronttheater
Ich beantrage Todesstrafe
Liebe am Don
Liebesnächte in der Taiga
Ninotschka, die Herrin der Taiga
Privatklinik
Schicksal aus zweiter Hand
Sie fielen vom Himmel
Strafbataillon 999
Viele Mütter heißen Anita
Wen die schwarze Göttin ruft
Wer stirbt schon gerne unter Palmen
Zerstörter Traum vom Ruhm
Zum Nachtisch wilde Früchte
Das Doppelspiel

Filmography 
The Doctor of Stalingrad, directed by Géza von Radványi (1958, based on the novel Der Arzt von Stalingrad)
, directed by Harald Philipp (1960, based on the novel Strafbataillon 999)
, directed by Harald Philipp (1967, based on the novel Liebesnächte in der Taiga)
, directed by Michael Thomas (1969, based on the novel Ein heißer Körper zu vermieten - written as Jens Bekker)
, directed by Michael Thomas (1970, based on the novel Schwarzer Nerz auf zarter Haut - written as Henry Pahlen)
Slaughter Hotel, directed by Fernando Di Leo (1971, based on the novel Das Schloß der blauen Vögel)
No Gold for a Dead Diver, directed by Harald Reinl (1974, based on the novel Ein toter Taucher nimmt kein Gold)
, directed by Alfred Vohrer (1974, based on the novel Wer stirbt schon gerne unter Palmen)
Vreemde Wêreld, directed by Jürgen Goslar (1974, based on the novel Entmündigt)
The Secret Carrier, directed by Franz Josef Gottlieb (1975)
Docteur Erika Werner, directed by Paul Siegrist (TV miniseries, 1978, based on the novel Dr. med. Erika Werner)
La Passion du docteur Bergh, directed by Josée Dayan (TV film, 1996, based on the novel Der rostende Ruhm)
One Step Too Far, directed by Udo Witte (TV film, 1998, based on the novel Eine Sünde zuviel)

Notes

External links

1921 births
1999 deaths
German war correspondents
German Army personnel of World War II
20th-century German novelists
German male novelists
20th-century German male writers
German male non-fiction writers
War correspondents of World War II
Hitler Youth members
Gestapo personnel
Deaths from cerebrovascular disease